Marion E. Burks (November 18, 1912 – November 29, 1989) was an American politician, judge, and lawyer.

Born in Eldorado, Illinois, Burks graduated from Eldorado Township High School in 1931. Burks received his bachelor's degree from Murray State University, in 1935, and his master's degree in education from University of Illinois, in 1940. He taught school in Eldorado, Illinois and then he received his law degree from Lincoln College of Law in Springfield, Illinois, in 1945. He practiced law in Evanston, Illinois. He also served as assistant director of the Illinois Department of Insurance and was chairman of the Central Casualty Company. He served in the Illinois House of Representatives from 1957 to 1963 and was a Republican. In 1962, Burks ran for the Republican nomination for the United States House of Representatives. However, he lost the primary to Donald Rumsfeld. Burks served as Illinois Circuit Court judge for Cook County, Illinois from 1976 to 1984. Burks died at an extended care facility in Sun City, Arizona.

Notes

1912 births
1989 deaths
People from Eldorado, Illinois
People from Evanston, Illinois
Murray State University alumni
University of Illinois College of Education alumni
Businesspeople from Illinois
Educators from Illinois
Illinois state court judges
Republican Party members of the Illinois House of Representatives
20th-century American politicians
Lincoln College of Law alumni
20th-century American businesspeople
20th-century American judges